Union Bank Basketball Club is a Nigerian professional basketball club. The club used to compete in the Nigerian Premier League. Founded in 2000 as the Gboko Heat, the team was sponsored by the Union Bank of Nigeria and adopted the bank's name in 2003.

In 2016, the team played entered private league African Basketball League (ABL) under the name Stallions. Because this league was not approved by FIBA, the club was suspended from playing in the Nigerian Premier League. Since that year, the team plays in the Division 2.

In African competitions
FIBA Africa Clubs Champions Cup  (3 appearances)
2005 – 4th Place
2008 – 7th Place
2011 – 8th Place

References

External links
Africa-Basket.com Team Page

Basketball teams in Nigeria
Basketball teams established in 2000
2000 establishments in Nigeria